María del Carmen Ecoro is an Equatoguinean politician and former Minister of Social Affairs and Gender Equality.

Biography

During her tenure as Minister of Social Affairs and Gender Equality, Mari Carmen Ecoro worked on interventions to promote gender equality and reduce the advent of gender based violence. Some of those interventions included increasing awareness among the populace and stipulation of legal mechanisms to arrest violence against women in particular.

Along with Mayor of Malabo, Maria Coloma Edjang Bengono, as among the two top senior female politicians in Equatorial Guinea in 2014, Ecoro left indications during an interview that women in her country were present at all senior government levels. This was in response to criticisms from the United Nations that women were lacking in leadership positions in most countries. She added that while "there are still things to improve", President Obiang Nguema Mbasogo's personal commitment to gender equality in Equatorial Guinea should be a model for others to emulate.

References

Government ministers of Equatorial Guinea
Women government ministers of Equatorial Guinea
Women's ministers
21st-century women politicians
Year of birth missing (living people)
Living people